Paraguay–Spain refers to the current and historical relations between Paraguay and Spain. Both nations are members of the Association of Spanish Language Academies and the Organization of Ibero-American States.

History

Spanish colonization

In 1524, Aleixo Garcia, a Portuguese explorer in the service of Spain arrived to present-day Paraguay. In 1536, the first Spanish settlements in Paraguay were established by Domingo Martínez de Irala in the Asunción region and initially, Spanish settlers lived in peace among the Guaraní people. In 1542, Paraguay officially became part of the Spanish Empire and governed by the newly created Viceroyalty of Peru based in Lima.

In the early 1600s, Jesuit missionaries began arriving to Paraguay and established missions to convert the local Guaraní people to Catholicism. This period was known as the Jesuit reduction. For the next 150 years, Jesuits developed their own autonomous area of control within Paraguay which led to conflict with the Spanish administration of the colony. From 1721 to 1735, Spanish landowners waged a struggle to overthrow the Jesuit monopoly of Indian trade and labor. Spanish and Portuguese troops joined together to overthrow the Jesuit dominance in the region which resulted in the Jesuits being expelled from Paraguay and nearby colonies in 1767.

Independence

In 1776, the Viceroyalty of the Río de la Plata was created based in Buenos Aires and Paraguay fell under its new administration. By the early 1800s, a sense of independence was spreading throughout Spanish America. In May 1810, the May Revolution occurred in Buenos Aires which began the Argentine War of Independence. Because Paraguay fell under the governance of Buenos Aires, the act of independence in Argentina affected Paraguay although leaders in Paraguay refused to accept the declaration of Argentine Independence.

Although initially Paraguay was against independence from Spain, in May 1811 a Junta was created in Asuncion led by Fulgencio Yegros. The Junta declared Paraguayan independence and in July 1811, they sent a letter to Buenos Aires expressing their desire of a confederation with Argentina, however, by October 1812, the confederation was disbanded after Argentina made its intentions to use Paraguayan troops for its own independence and interprovincial quarrels. In October 1812 Paraguay declared itself an independent republic.

Post independence

On 10 September 1880, both Paraguay and Spain signed a Treaty of Peace and Friendship thus officially establishing diplomatic relations between both nations. During the Spanish Civil War (1936-1939), eight Paraguayan nationals (known as Miliciano guaraní) fought in the war as part of the International Brigades for the Republican faction  and they fought in the Battle of the Ebro.

Paraguay  maintained diplomatic relations throughout General Francisco Franco’s  administration. Relations between Paraguay and Spain strengthened under the Presidency of Alfredo Stroessner. In July 1973, President Stroessner paid an official visit to Spain and met with General Franco.

In October 1990, Spanish King Juan Carlos I paid his first official visit to Paraguay.  The King would visit Paraguay again in 2006 and once more in 2011 to attend the Ibero-American Summit being held in the Paraguayan capital. In June 2015, Paraguayan President Horacio Cartes paid an official visit to Spain.

Bilateral relations
Over the years, several agreements and treaties have been signed by both nations such as an Agreement on the Exchange of Diplomatic Packages (1925); Agreement on Cultural Exchanges (1958); Agreement on Dual-Citizenship (1959); Agreement on the Elimination of Visa Requirements (1959); Agreement on Economic Cooperation (1971); Agreement on Air Transportation (1976); Agreement on the Promotion and Protection of Investments (1993); Extradition Treaty (1998); Agreement on the participation of citizens who legally reside in either Paraguay or Spain to participate in local elections (2009) and an Agreement on Cyber security Cooperation (2015).

Transportation
There are direct flights between both nations with Air Europa.

Trade

In 2018, trade between Paraguay and Spain totaled €176 million Euros. Paraguay's main exports to Spain include: vegetable oil, wood, perfumes, tobacco and furniture. Spain's main exports to Paraguay include: perfume, machinery, paper, automobile and trucks, electrical equipment and airplanes. That same year, Spain had US$29 million worth of investments in Paraguay. Spanish multinational companies such as Banco Bilbao Vizcaya Argentaria and Mapfre operate in Paraguay.

Resident diplomatic missions
 Paraguay has an embassy in Madrid and consulates-general in Barcelona and in Málaga.
 Spain has an embassy in Asunción.

See also 
 Paraguayans in Spain

References 

 
Spain
Paraguay